The V District, also known as Itäranta (Finnish; Öststranden in Swedish, meaning 'east bank'), is one of the central districts of Turku, Finland. As its name suggests, it is located on the east side of the river Aura, and stretches from the IV District (Martti) all the way to the mouth of the river. The district is strongly associated with the sea - it neighbours the Port of Turku across the river, and its street names have a ship-related theme.

The district has a population of 3,677 and an annual population growth rate of -1.25%. 13.41% of the district's population are under 15 years old, while 10.31% are over 65. The district's linguistic makeup is 90.02% Finnish, 5.17% Swedish, and 4.81% other.

See also
 Districts of Turku
 Districts of Turku by population

5